Seoca  is a village in the municipality of Novo Goražde, Republika Srpska, Bosnia and Herzegovina. According to the 2013 census, the village has 7 inhabitants.

References

Populated places in Novo Goražde